Marcel Leineweber (7 December 1912 – 5 November 1969) was a Luxembourgian gymnast. He competed in eight events at the 1936 Summer Olympics.

References

1912 births
1969 deaths
Luxembourgian male artistic gymnasts
Olympic gymnasts of Luxembourg
Gymnasts at the 1936 Summer Olympics
People from Pétange
20th-century Luxembourgian people